This is a list of monuments in Marsa, Malta, which are listed on the National Inventory of the Cultural Property of the Maltese Islands.

List 

 
|}

References

Marsa
Marsa, Malta